1-Chloropentane is an alkyl halide with the chemical formula CH3(CH2)4Cl. It is a colorless, flammable liquid. It can be prepared from 1-pentanol by treatment with hydrogen chloride.

See also
 tert-Amyl chloride

References

Chloroalkanes